Rochester Community Schools or Rochester School District may refer to the following school districts in the United States:

 Rochester Community School Corporation, Rochester, Indiana
 Rochester Community Unit School District 3A, Rochester, Illinois
 Old Rochester Regional School District, Rochester, Massachusetts
 Rochester Community Schools (Michigan), Rochester Hills, Michigan
 Rochester Public Schools, Rochester, Minnesota
 Rochester School Department, Rochester, New Hampshire
 Rochester City School District, Rochester, New York
 Rochester Area School District, Rochester, Pennsylvania
 Rochester Independent School District, Rochester, Texas
 Rochester School District (Washington), Rochester, Washington